The 1981 Central American and Caribbean Championships in Athletics were held at the Estadio Olímpico Juan Pablo Duarte in Santo Domingo, Dominican Republic between 10–12 July.

Medal summary

Men's events

Women's events

Medal table

See also
1981 in athletics (track and field)

External links
Men Results – GBR Athletics
Women Results – GBR Athletics

Central American and Caribbean Championships in Athletics
Central American and Caribbean Championships
Ath
A
A